Rhododendron wiltonii, called the Wilton rhododendron and the wrinkled-skin rhododendron, is a species of flowering plant in the genus Rhododendron native to southcentral China. It has gained the Royal Horticultural Society's Award of Garden Merit.

References

wiltonii
Endemic flora of China
Plants described in 1910